Chelan County is a county in the U.S. state of Washington. As of the 2020 census, its population was 79,074. The county seat and largest city is Wenatchee. The county was created out of Okanogan and Kittitas Counties on March 13, 1899. It derives its name from a Chelan Indian word meaning "deep water," likely a reference to -long Lake Chelan, which reaches a maximum depth of 1,486 feet (453 m).

Chelan County is part of the Wenatchee, Washington, Metropolitan Statistical Area.

Geography
It is the third-largest county in Washington by area.

Geographic features
Bonanza Peak, highest point in Chelan County
Cascade Mountains
Chelan Mountains
Chelan River
Chiwaukum Mountains
Columbia River
Entiat Mountains
Entiat River
Lake Chelan
Lake Wenatchee
Stuart Range
The Enchantments
Wenatchee Mountains
Wenatchee River
Columbia River Basalt

Major highways
 U.S. Route 2
 U.S. Route 97

Adjacent counties
Okanogan County - northeast
Douglas County - east
Kittitas County - south
King County - southwest
Snohomish County - west
Skagit County - northwest

National protected areas
 Lake Chelan National Recreation Area
 North Cascades National Park (part)
 Wenatchee National Forest (part)
 Alpine Lakes Wilderness

Demographics

2000 census
As of the census of 2000, there were 66,616 people, 25,021 households, and 17,364 families living in the county. The population density was 23 people per square mile (9/km2). There were 30,407 housing units at an average density of 10 per square mile (4/km2). The racial makeup of the county was 83.63% White, 0.26% Black or African American, 0.99% Native American, 0.68% Asian, 0.12% Pacific Islander, 12.19% from other races, and 2.14% from two or more races. 19.26% of the population were Hispanic or Latino of any race. 16.9% were of German, 11.2% English, 9.3% United States or American and 7.1% Irish ancestry. 80.9% spoke English and 18.1% Spanish as their first language.

There were 25,021 households, out of which 34.50% had children under the age of 18 living with them, 56.40% were married couples living together, 8.70% had a female householder with no husband present, and 30.60% were non-families. 25.10% of all households were made up of individuals, and 10.80% had someone living alone who was 65 years of age or older. The average household size was 2.62 and the average family size was 3.14.

In the county, the population was spread out, with 28.00% under the age of 18, 8.30% from 18 to 24, 27.20% from 25 to 44, 22.70% from 45 to 64, and 13.90% who were 65 years of age or older. The median age was 36 years. For every 100 females, there were 99.10 males. For every 100 females age 18 and over, there were 96.80 males.

The median income for a household in the county was $37,316, and the median income for a family was $46,293. Males had a median income of $35,065 versus $25,838 for females. The per capita income for the county was $19,273. About 8.80% of families and 12.40% of the population were below the poverty line, including 16.00% of those under age 18 and 7.40% of those age 65 or over.

2010 census
As of the 2010 census, there were 72,453 people, 27,827 households, and 18,795 families living in the county. The racial makeup of the county was 79.3% white, 1.0% American Indian, 0.8% Asian, 0.3% black or African American, 0.1% Pacific islander, 15.7% from other races, and 2.7% from two or more races. Those of Hispanic or Latino origin made up 25.8% of the population. In terms of ancestry, 17.6% were German, 15.0% were American, 11.3% were English, and 8.3% were Irish.

Of the 27,827 households, 32.4% had children under the age of 18 living with them, 52.7% were married couples living together, 9.7% had a female householder with no husband present, 32.5% were non-families, and 26.3% of all households were made up of individuals. The average household size was 2.57 and the average family size was 3.10. The median age was 39.3 years.

The median income for a household in the county was $48,674 and the median income for a family was $57,856. Males had a median income of $41,076 versus $34,261 for females. The per capita income for the county was $24,378. About 8.2% of families and 11.5% of the population were below the poverty line, including 16.8% of those under age 18 and 9.0% of those age 65 or over.

Communities

Cities

Cashmere
Chelan
Entiat
Leavenworth
Wenatchee (county seat)

Census-designated places

Chelan Falls
Manson
South Wenatchee
Sunnyslope

Unincorporated communities

Ardenvoir
Coles Corner
Dryden
Holden Village
Lucerne
Malaga
Maplecreek
Merritt
Monitor
Peshastin
Plain
Stehekin
Telma
Wenatchee Heights
West Wenatchee
Winton

Ghost towns
Blewett
 Trinity

Politics
Chelan County is part of the 8th Congressional District federally, represented by Democrat Kim Schrier. Formerly a Republican Party stronghold, it has narrowed up considerably in recent years, with Donald Trump only carrying the county by around 8 points over Joe Biden in 2020.

See also
 Chelan County Public Utility District
 Indian Pass, Washington
 Lake Chelan AVA
National Register of Historic Places listings in Chelan County, Washington
 USS Chelan County (LST-542)
 Wenatchee Valley College
 Wenatchee School District

References

Further reading
Available online through the Washington State Library's Classics in Washington History collection

External links
Chelan County
Chelan County Emergency Management
Port of Chelan County
 Port of Chelan County´s clean technology cluster

 
1899 establishments in Washington (state)
Populated places established in 1899
Wenatchee–East Wenatchee metropolitan area
North Cascades of Washington (state)
Eastern Washington
Washington placenames of Native American origin